The 1985–86 Santosh Trophy was the 42nd edition of the Santosh Trophy, the main State competition for football in India. It was held in Jabalpur, Bilaspur and Bhilai in Madhya Pradesh. Punjab defeated Bengal in tie-breaker to retain the title.

28 teams took part. Ten teams were seeded to the quarter final league. The other 18 teams were divided into six clusters from which one team each qualified to the quarter final. Two clusters each were played in Jabalpur, Bilaspur and Bhilai. The sixteen teams were divided into four groups for the quarter final.

Quarter-final

Group A

Group B

Group C

After Maharashtra and Goa finished the group with 5 points, their match was replayed to decide the semifinalist. Goa won 4-2. Group C matches were played in Bhilai. Goa had to take an 11 hour bus ride to play Punjab in the semifinal at Jabalpur two days later.

Group D

Semifinals

Final

Notes
The RSSSF pages used as reference give the tie-breaker score as 4-1 and 4-2 in two places.

References 

Santosh Trophy seasons
1985–86 in Indian football